Changu Kana Thakur Institute of Management Studies & Research is a management institute affiliated to the University of Mumbai and located in New Panvel, Navi Mumbai. The institute was started in 2008. The institute is approved by All India Council for Technical Education and currently offers a Master of Management Studies (MMS) program.

Affiliates of the University of Mumbai
Educational institutions established in 2008
Education in Raigad district
2008 establishments in Maharashtra